Tuda Mengu, also known as Tode Mongke,  Tudamongke, was khan of the Golden Horde,  division of the Mongol Empire from 1280 to 1287.

Biography
Tode Mongke was the son of Toqoqan (grandson of Batu Khan) and younger full-brother of Mongke Temur. A pious khan, he converted to Islam in 1280. Due to his deep religion, Tudamongke was not aggressive to expand his territory. However, he did keep good contact with Mamluk Sultanate in Egypt against Ilkhanate who was faithless enemy of both states. Rashid Ad-din wrote that he was willing to keep good relations with Kublai khan and released his son Nomoghan to Yuan Court. During his government the influence of Nogai Khan greatly increased in the Golden Horde, and there was a second attack against Hungary in 1284/1285, which was a total disaster for his army. He abdicated in favor to his nephew Tole Buqa in 1287.

Family
He had two wives and several concubines:

 Ariqachi Khatun (from Khongirad tribe)
 Or-Menggü
 Töre Qutluq Khatun (from Alchi-Tatar tribe)
 Chechektü
 Unknown concubine
 Töbetei

See also
 List of Khans of the Golden Horde
 Mengü

References

Further reading
 David Morgan, The Mongols

1280s deaths
Khans of the Golden Horde
Mongol Empire Muslims
Converts to Islam
Year of death missing
13th-century monarchs in Europe
Year of birth unknown